The Pčinja District is one of nine administrative districts of Southern and Eastern Serbia. It covers the southern part of Serbia, bordering the disputed territory of Kosovo, along with Bulgaria and North Macedonia. Its administrative center is the city of Vranje.

As of 2022 census, the district has a population of 197,765 inhabitants.

The Vranjska Banja spa plays a part in this region, with its multi-medicinal thermal mineral waters.

Municipalities
It encompasses the municipalities of:
 Vladičin Han
 Surdulica
 Bosilegrad
 Trgovište
 Vranje
 Bujanovac
 Preševo

Culture and history
The ancient Paeonian tribe of the Agrianians ruled the region in antiquity.

Cultural-historic monuments date back from over five centuries ago. The earliest military fortification, Marko's Fortress, was established in the 13th century. Also famous are the ancient Turkish public baths from the 16th century and the Pasha's House from 1765, in which a grammar school was opened in 1882.

In 2001, uprisings by Albanians occurred in the Albanian-majority municipalities of Preševo and Bujanovac. In addition, reports emerged in 2006 that the municipality of Trgovište had threatened to secede itself to North Macedonia, which was noteworthy because it has a majority Serb population. Representatives cited economic hardship and a declining population as grievances against Serbia’s government.

Demographics

As of 2022 census, the district has a population of 197,765 inhabitants.

Ethnic composition

See also
 Administrative divisions of Serbia
 Districts of Serbia

Notes

References

 Note: All official material made by the Government of Serbia is public by law. Information was taken from the official website.

External links

 

 
Districts of Southern and Eastern Serbia